Phosphorine (IUPAC name: phosphinine) is a heavier element analog of pyridine, containing a phosphorus atom instead of an aza- moiety. It is also called phosphabenzene and belongs to the phosphaalkene class. It is a colorless liquid that is mainly of interest in research.

Phosphorine is an air-sensitive oil but is otherwise stable when handled using air-free techniques (however, substituted derivatives can often be handled under air without risk of decomposition). In contrast, silabenzene, a related heavy-element analogue of benzene, is not only air- and moisture-sensitive but also thermally unstable without extensive steric protection.

History
The first phosphorine to be isolated is 2,4,6-triphenylphosphorine. It was synthesized by Gottfried Märkl in 1966 by condensation of the corresponding pyrylium salt and phosphine or its equivalent ( P(CH2OH)3 and P(SiMe3)3).

The (unsubstituted) parent phosphorine was reported by Arthur J. Ashe III in 1971. Ring-opening approaches have been developed from phospholes.

Structure, bonding, and properties
Structural studies by electron diffraction reveal that phosphorine is a planar aromatic compound with 88% of aromaticity of that of benzene. Potentially relevant to its high aromaticity are the well matched electronegativities of phosphorus (2.1) and carbon (2.5). The P–C bond length is 173 pm and the C–C bond lengths center around 140 pm  and show little variation.

Although phosphorine and pyridine are structurally similar, phosphorines are far less basic. The pKa of C5H5PH+ and C5H5NH+ are respectively −16.1 and +5.2. Methyllithium adds to phosphorus in phosphorine whereas it adds to the 2-position of pyridine.

Phosphorine undergoes electrophilic substitution reactions like ordinary aromatic compounds: bromination, acylation, and so on.

Coordination chemistry
Coordination complexes bearing phosphorine as a ligand are known. Phosphorines can bind to metals through phosphorus center.  Complexes of the diphospha analogue of 2,2′-bipyridine are known. Phosphorines also form pi-complexes, illustrated by V(η6-C5H5P)2.

See also 
 Six-membered aromatic rings with one carbon replaced by an element from another group: borabenzene, silabenzene, germabenzene, stannabenzene, pyridine, phosphorine, arsabenzene, stibabenzene, bismabenzene, pyrylium, thiopyrylium, selenopyrylium, telluropyrylium

References 

 

Phosphorus heterocycles
Six-membered rings
Substances discovered in the 1970s